The 7th FINA Short Course World Championships were held at the Conseco Fieldhouse in Indianapolis, Indiana, United States from October 7 through October 11, 2004.

Results

Freestyle

Backstroke

Breaststroke

Butterfly

Medley

Medal table

References
FINA Official Website
 Swim Rankings Results

FINA World Swimming Championships (25 m)
FINA World Swimming Ch
S
S
S
FINA World Swimming Championships (25 m)
Sports competitions in Indianapolis
2000s in Indianapolis
Swimming competitions in Indiana